Killi Faizo is a UNHCR staging refugee camp on the Afghan-Pakistan border, in Chaman, Pakistan - two kilometres into the country. A parallel camp exists on the other side of the border. It was opened in late 2001 as a response to the U.S. invasion of Afghanistan.

Medical organisations such as Médecins Sans Frontières (particularly MSF-Holland) operate inside the camp. The World Food Program provides wheat flour, beans and vegetable oil for the Afghan refugees in the camp. Physically, the site can accommodate up to 10,000 people - though authorities attempt to limit this to 1,600 (or 600 tents). Upon overcrowding, refugees are often transferred to Roghani which, with Tor Tangi have a capacity of 50,000.

Afghan refugee camps
Refugee camps in Pakistan
Afghan diaspora in Pakistan